"sprinter/ARIA" is the second single by Kalafina, featuring Wakana Ootaki and Keiko Kubota, along with two new members, Maya Toyoshima and Hikaru Masai. "ARIA" was used as theme song for the fourth chapter of Kara no Kyoukai while "sprinter" was used for the fifth chapter.

Track listings

CD

DVD

Charts

References

2008 singles
Kalafina songs
Songs written by Yuki Kajiura
Songs written for animated films
Japanese film songs